Puya penduliflora is a species in the genus Puya. This species is endemic to Bolivia.

References

penduliflora
Flora of Bolivia